Tante Jutta aus Kalkutta ("Aunt Jutta from Calcutta") is a 1953 West German comedy film adapted from the play of the same name. It was directed by Karl Georg Külb and starred Viktor Staal, Ida Wüst, and Ingrid Lutz.

It was made in Munich. The film's sets were designed by the Norwegian art director Arne Flekstad.

Cast

References

Bibliography

External links 
 

1953 films
1953 comedy films
German comedy films
West German films
1950s German-language films
Films directed by Karl Georg Külb
German films based on plays
Films with screenplays by Karl Georg Külb
German black-and-white films
1950s German films